Peverell Park is a cricket ground in Plymouth, Devon.  The ground is located close to Plymouth Albion's home ground, The Brickfields, which is located in the Devonport district of the city.

The first recorded match on the ground was in 1924,after Plymouth Cricket Club had acquired the land. The ground hosted its first Minor Counties Championship match when Devon played Wiltshire in 1921. From 1921 to 1995, the ground played host to 23 Minor Counties Championship matches, with the final match seeing Devon host Oxfordshire, which was the last time Devon played at the ground.

The ground hosted a single List-A match Minor Counties South played Somerset in the 1972 Benson and Hedges Cup.

In local domestic cricket, Peverell Park is the home ground of Plymouth Cricket Club who now play in the Devon Cricket League at Mount Wise.

References

External links
Peverell Park on CricketArchive
Peverell Park on Cricinfo

Cricket grounds in Devon
Sports venues in Plymouth, Devon
Devon County Cricket Club
Sports venues completed in 1858
1858 establishments in England